Nolly may refer to:-

 Jay Nolly, American soccer player
 Nolly (TV series), about English actress Noele Gordon
 Adam "Nolly" Getgood, musician who played for Periphery (band)

See also 
 Nolle (disambiguation)